The Musée d'art moderne de Troyes is one of the two main museums in the French city of Troyes - the other is the Musée des Beaux-Arts de Troyes. It is located in the city's former 16th- and 17th-century episcopal palace. It was opened in 1982 by president François Mitterrand following Pierre and Denise Lévy's 1976 donation of several modern artworks to their home-town of Troyes.

External links

 Official website

Musee d'art moderne de Troyes
Contemporary art galleries in France
Modern art museums in France
Art museums and galleries in France
Musee d'art moderne de Troyes
Art museums established in 1982